Vengarai Thippanvidudhi is a village in the Orathanadu taluk of Thanjavur district, Tamil Nadu, India.

Demographics 

As per the 2001 census, Vengarai Thippanvidudhi had a total population of 1794 with 851 males and 943 females. The sex ratio was 1108. The literacy rate was 53.61.

References 

 

Villages in Thanjavur district